Rumba may refer to:

Dance and music

Genres
Cuban rumba, a traditional Cuban music genre
Galician rumba, a music genre of Galicia, Spain, influenced by Cuban music.
Rhumba, also known as ballroom rumba, an American style of ballroom music
Rumba flamenca, a style of flamenco
Catalan rumba, a Spanish popular music style
Rumba criolla, a genre of Colombian popular music
Congolese rumba, a genre of music that originated in the Congo Basin during the 1940s

Instruments
Rumba shakers, better known as maracas
Rumba box, better known as marímbula

Songs
"Rumba" (Anahí song), song by Mexican singer Anahí 
Rumba, composition for harp by Carlos Salzedo (1885-1961)
Rumba, composition for guitar by Manuel María Ponce (1882-1948) 
"Rumba", a track on Ill Niño's album Revolution Revolución

Albums
The Rumba Foundation, album by Jesse Cook

Film
Rumberas film, Mexican film genre
Rumba (1935 film), 1935 musical drama film starring George Raft and Carole Lombard
Rumba (2008 film), 2008 comedy film starring Dominique Abel and Fiona Gordon

People
Alberts Rumba (1892–1962), a Latvian speed skater
Nima Rumba, a Nepalese pop singer
Rumba Munthali (born 1978), a Canadian soccer player

Places
Rumba, Estonia, a village in Estonia
Rumba parish, a parish in Latvia

Other
Rumba, an ESA satellite in the Cluster II mission
RUMBA, software product
One of three flavors named after dances (Rumba, Samba, Tango) of Rumba Juice energy drink distributed by Hansen Beverage Company
Rumba (sculpture), a sculpture in Helsinki, Finland
, a Finnish music magazine

See also
Roomba, autonomous robotic vacuum cleaner sold by iRobot